George Dick-Lauder may refer to:
 Sir George Dick-Lauder, 12th Baronet, British author and soldier
 Sir George Dick-Lauder, 10th Baronet, Indian Civil Service administrator